(born 25 July 1984) is a Japanese hurdler.

He won the bronze medal at the 2001 World Youth Championships, and the gold medals at the 2005 Summer Universiade and the 2006 Asian Games. He also competed at the World Championships in 2005 and 2007 and the 2008 Olympic Games without reaching the final.

His personal best time is 47.93 seconds, achieved in May 2006 in Osaka.

Personal bests

Records
4×100 m relay
Former Japanese youth best holder - 40.14 s (relay leg: 4th) (Debrecen, 15 July 2001)
4×400 m relay
Current Japanese university record holder - 3:03.20 s (relay leg: 4th) (İzmir, 20 August 2005)

 with Masaya Aikawa, Shōta Abe, and Masami Yasuda
 with Kazunori Ōta, Yoshihiro Horigome, and Yūki Yamaguchi

Competition record

National Championship

References

External links

Kenji Narisako profile at JAAF 

1984 births
Living people
Japanese sportsperson-politicians
Japanese male hurdlers
Olympic male hurdlers
Olympic athletes of Japan
Athletes (track and field) at the 2008 Summer Olympics
Asian Games gold medalists for Japan
Asian Games medalists in athletics (track and field)
Athletes (track and field) at the 2006 Asian Games
Athletes (track and field) at the 2010 Asian Games
Medalists at the 2006 Asian Games
Universiade gold medalists for Japan
Universiade silver medalists for Japan
Universiade medalists in athletics (track and field)
Medalists at the 2005 Summer Universiade
World Athletics Championships athletes for Japan
Japan Championships in Athletics winners
Sportspeople from Ōita Prefecture
20th-century Japanese people
21st-century Japanese people